Kazhymukan Munaitpasov Stadium may refer to:
 Kazhymukan Munaitpasov Stadium (Astana), a multi-purpose stadium in Astana, Kazakhstan
 Kazhymukan Munaitpasov Stadium (Shymkent), a multi-purpose stadium in Shymkent, Kazakhstan